WPXC (102.9 MHz, "Pixy 103") is an FM radio station broadcasting a mainstream rock format. Licensed to Hyannis, Massachusetts, the station serves the Cape Cod area with its studios located on South Street in Hyannis and its transmitter in West Barnstable.

History

In February 2005, Ernie Boch, Sr. sold WPXC, WTWV, WDVT, WCOD, and WXTK to Qantum Communications. Due to the FCC's rules on ownership caps, Qantum had to put WTWV, WDVT, and WPXC up for a pending sale.

In March 2005, Nassau Broadcasting Partners bought the three stations from Qantum Communications. WPXC's sister stations WTWV and WDVT became WFRQ and WFQR.

On May 4, 2012, Nassau Broadcasting and its lenders auctioned off all of their Cape stations to John Garabedian. John Garabedian made no change WPXC's format or staff, but CodComm designed new logos and websites for Pixy 103 and Frank FM.

On May 1, 2014, WPXC started transmitting an HD Radio digital signal. WPXC started simulcasting WFRQ on the HD2, and WKFY on the HD3 to feed the translators on 94.7 (W230AW, now W234DP) and 100.5/103.5 (W263CU)/(W278DW) respectively.

References

External links

CodComm website

PXC
Mainstream rock radio stations in the United States
Barnstable, Massachusetts
PXC
Radio stations established in 1987
1987 establishments in Massachusetts